The Billboard Hot 100 is a chart that ranks the best-performing songs in the United States. Its data, published by Billboard magazine and compiled by MRC Data, is based collectively on each song's weekly physical and digital sales, as well as the amount of airplay received on American radio stations and streaming on online digital music outlets.

During 2020, twenty singles reached number-one on the Hot 100, making 2020 the year with the most number-one hits on the Hot 100 since 1991, which had twenty-seven. In addition, two other number-one singles in 2020, "All I Want for Christmas Is You" by Mariah Carey and "Circles" by Post Malone, had each previously hit number one in 2019. Twenty-five artists reached the top of the Hot 100 in 2020, with thirteen—Roddy Ricch, Kid Cudi, Doja Cat, Nicki Minaj, Megan Thee Stallion, DaBaby, 6ix9ine, Harry Styles, BTS, M.I.A., Jawsh 685, 24kGoldn, and Iann Dior—achieving their first number-one single. Ariana Grande and BTS scored three number ones each. Ricch's "The Box" was the longest-running number-one of the year, leading the chart for eleven weeks, whereas the Weeknd's "Blinding Lights" was the year's best performing song on the chart, topping the Billboard Year-End Hot 100.

For the first time since 1990, six different songs topped the Hot 100 in six consecutive weeks, namely "The Scotts" by The Scotts (Travis Scott and Kid Cudi), "Say So" by Doja Cat featuring Minaj, "Stuck with U" by Grande and Justin Bieber, "Savage" by Megan Thee Stallion featuring Beyoncé, "Rain on Me" by Lady Gaga and Grande, and "Rockstar" by DaBaby featuring Ricch. Billboard highlighted this unusual amount of turnover for the number-one spot on the chart, and cited many reasons to this phenomenon—song remixes, organized fan buying/streaming activities and the release of numerous collectible physical copies (CDs and vinyls) and bundles by artists to encourage their fans to purchase multiple copies of a song. This made the Hot 100 chart "more of a first-week factor than usual", explaining the drop in sales units of a song after it peaked at the number-one spot.

In July 2020, Billboard announced that the Hot 100 chart would "no longer allow" the sales of physical/digital bundles (physical singles that are clubbed with digital downloads) to be reported as digital sales, which is a "widespread" industry practice of not manufacturing and shipping the vinyls, CDs and other physical copies to consumers for weeks or months, but making the bundled digital download instantly redeemable, a tactic generally used by artists like Grande, Bieber and 6ix9ine to boost their chart positions; Billboard asserted that those physical singles would only be counted when they are shipped to the consumer, making the tactic "ineffectual".

The year 2020 broke the record for the calendar year that spawned the most number-one debuts on the Hot 100, with twelve songs debuting atop the chart: Drake's "Toosie Slide", "The Scotts" by Scott and Cudi, "Stuck With U" by Grande and Bieber, "Rain On Me" by Gaga and Grande, "Trollz" by 6ix9ine and Minaj, Taylor Swift's "Cardigan", Cardi B's "WAP" featuring Megan Thee Stallion, BTS's "Dynamite", Scott's "Franchise" featuring Young Thug and M.I.A., Grande's "Positions", BTS's "Life Goes On", and Swift's "Willow", in that order. 2020 further marked the first calendar year in Hot 100 history to have more than one all-female collaboration reach the number-one spot, with four.

Chart history

Number-one artists

See also
2020 in American music
List of Billboard 200 number-one albums of 2020
List of Billboard Global 200 number ones of 2020
List of Billboard Hot 100 top-ten singles in 2020
Billboard Year-End Hot 100 singles of 2020

Notes

References

United States Hot 100
2020
Hot 100 number-one singles